Rajganj Government Polytechnic, is a government polytechnic located in Rajganj, Jalpaiguri district, West Bengal, India.

About college
This polytechnic is affiliated to the West Bengal State Council of Technical Education,  and recognised by AICTE, New Delhi. This polytechnic offers diploma courses in Electrical, Mechanical, and Civil engineering.

See also

References

External links
Official website WBSCTE
Rajganj Government Polytechnic

Universities and colleges in Jalpaiguri district
Technical universities and colleges in West Bengal
Educational institutions established in 2016
2016 establishments in West Bengal